Ten Toes Down is the eighth studio album by the American southern hip hop duo 8Ball & MJG. The album was released on May 4, 2010, by Grand Hustle Records, E1 Music and Atlantic Records. This is the first album by the duo after leaving the Bad Boy South, before signing a record deal with the Grand Hustle label. The album has guest appearances by T.I., Young Dro, Slim Thug and Bun B with production by T.I., as well as Nitti, Drumma Boy, Nard & B and Lil' C, among others.

The album sold 20,000 copies in its first week, when it entered the US Billboard 200 chart at number 36.

Singles 
The album's second single, "Bring It Back", was released on February 2, 2010. The song was produced by Nitti and includes guest vocals by their label-mate Young Dro. The music video, directed by Gabriel Hart, was released on March 28, 2010.

Critical reception

Mitchell Hannah of HipHopDX said, "Lacking evolution by continually conceding to major labels’ cookie-cutter templates, Ten Toes Down comes as a disappointment, especially for those from the B.C. era. Nevertheless, the album retains nostalgia value and places Ball & G among a select number of 20-year veterans that are able to stay remotely close to relevant."

Commercial performance
The album entered the Billboard 200 at number 36, selling 16,000 copies in the United States in its first week.

Track listing

Charts

References

2010 albums
8Ball & MJG albums
Grand Hustle Records albums
E1 Music albums
Albums produced by Drumma Boy
Albums produced by David Banner
Albums produced by Lil' C (record producer)
Albums produced by Nard & B
Albums produced by 1500 or Nothin'